Karl Keki Singporewala is a British artist and architect, born 1983 in Crawley, West Sussex. Studied architecture at Leicester School of Architecture, De Montfort University, post graduate architecture at University of Brighton  and then a further post graduate at the Bartlett, University College London. He is an annual visiting critic for the BA (Hons) Interior Architecture degree at Arts University Bournemouth.

In 2014 he was voted the 'People's Choice' HIX Art Award Winner at the Cock 'n' Bull Gallery, Shoreditch London in a competition aimed at emerging artists. In 2007 was awarded by Channel 4's 4Talent as one of the UK's young creative heroes Has donated numerous drawings and maquettes for charity, including auctioning various pieces for London-based charity Article 25 (formally Architects for Aid).

In 2017, his work was exhibited at the Saatchi Gallery, London. Recognised for his mathematical geometries, religious subplots and love affair with London's buildings his work is generally exhibited through the Royal Academy of Arts, London.

In 2020, his photo etched brass sculpture 'Doppel Communion' was the recipient of the inaugural Royal West of England Academy - Art Prize for a work by an artist of Black Asian or Ethnic Minority heritage.

References

External links 
 Singporewala.co.uk
 The Glass Magazine
 London-Art.net
 10x10 London, Article 25

1983 births
British artists
British designers
Living people
English people of Indian descent
English people of Parsi descent
British Zoroastrians
People associated with Arts University Bournemouth